This is the filmography of the Taiwanese actress and producer Ruby Lin. After playing in various series and films, her production debut turned out to be a hit with viewers. The Chinese media considered Lin served as a shining example for star-turned-producer.

As actress

Television

Television film

Film

Dubbing

Short film

Theatre

Huangmei opera

As director or producer
In 2009, Lin sought to have greater control over her career by forming her own production, Ruby Studio. For its debut production she bought the rights to the popular novel Qing Shi Huang Fei (倾世皇妃) - The Glamorous Imperial Concubine, a story about the power struggles during the Five Dynasties and Ten Kingdoms period. It was reported that Lin attracted a great deal of investment in the production and assembled a team of male stars. All casts are invited by herself. She also invited director Gao Xixi as an investor of the series. He make consultant for the fighting sequences and battles befitting to the brutal warring period.

Filming began on January 15, 2011 in Hengdian World Studios, China. The series started airing on 30th, October 2011 on Hunan TV's golden time (China's second biggest television network). According to the China audience rating survey CSM27, it recorded the highest viewing rate from the first episode. According to the Shanghaidaily news, one week after screening domestically, it made back all of its 100 million yuan investment.
 
In December 2011, as a result of high rating and positive receptions, Lin won "Best producer" for her producing at 2011 Youku drama awards.  Also she was crowned Best Actress and The Glamorous Imperial Concubine was selected as top 10 TV series of the year. Following her performance in The Glamorous Imperial Concubine, Lin extended her production business to romantic TV series and micro films in China and Taiwan. In June 2012, Lin held a press conference at Shanghai TV Festival for her upcoming projects.

Since the establishment of the Ruby Lin studio in 2010, Lin has produced 11 TV series and films which have been nominated for numerous awards. In September 2015, her production The Way We Were had a triumphant showing at Taiwan's the 50th Golden Bell Awards, with three victories for Best Television Series, Director and Supporting Actress. Chinese media considered Lin served as a shining example for star-turned-producer.

Other works

Hosting

Variety show

Music videos

References

External links 
 

Filmography
Actress filmographies
Taiwanese filmographies